Mezhdurechensky (masculine), Mezhdurechenskaya (feminine), or Mezhdurechenskoye (neuter) is the name of several inhabited localities in Russia.

Urban localities
Mezhdurechensky, Khanty-Mansi Autonomous Okrug, an urban-type settlement in Kondinsky District of Khanty-Mansi Autonomous Okrug

Rural localities
Mezhdurechensky, Arkhangelsk Oblast, a settlement in Pinezhsky District of Arkhangelsk Oblast